This is a list of events in Scottish television from 1974.

Events

January
No events.

February
28 February – Television coverage of the February general election.

March
No events.

April
20 April – Tenth anniversary of BBC Two Scotland.

May to September
No events.

October
10 October – Television coverage of the October general election.

November
No events.

December
12 December – Official opening of STV's new studios by Princess Alexandra. The original home of STV, the Theatre Royal, are sold to Scottish Opera for conversion as Scotland’s first opera house.

Television series
Scotsport (1957–2008)
Reporting Scotland (1968–1983; 1984–present)
Top Club (1971–1998)
Scotland Today (1972–2009)
Sutherland's Law (1973–1976)

Births
15 January - Edith Bowman, music critic, radio and television presenter
30 October - Kerry McGregor, singer-songwriter and actress (died 2012)
Unknown - Nick Ede, television presenter

Deaths
29 May - James MacTaggart, 46, television producer

See also
1974 in Scotland

References

 
Television in Scotland by year
1970s in Scottish television